Sol Patrick is a character from the British soap opera Hollyoaks.  

Patrick is the show's "resident bad boy" with a history of homelessness, a stint in a Young Offender Institution, and a temperament that causes him trouble.  For the cliffhanger final episode of 2000, Patrick and his girlfriend, Jess Holt (Frankie Hough), were trapped by a fire "in the Hollyoaks local".  When he left the show, Patrick was "fleeing the area for his own good" with Holt.

Portrayed by Paul Danan, Patrick appeared on the Channel 4 soap opera from 1997–2001.  In 2017, Danan said he was speaking with the showrunners to bring back his character, though a representative for Hollyoaks denied any such talks.  In 2018, he continued to publicly voice his support for Patrick's return.

References

Hollyoaks characters
male characters in television
television characters introduced in 1997